Koefnoen (say: koof noon) was a popular Dutch television show, aired by the AVRO between 2004 and 2016. The first episode aired on 17 September 2004. The sketches on this show were taking a look at the past week.

Most characters in Koefnoen were done by Dutch comedians Owen Schumacher and Paul Groot. A few other comedians supported them in the show. A lot of these comedians previously worked for Kopspijkers, another Dutch television show.

'Koefnoen' is a Dutch-Yiddish word and means "for free". The word comes from 'kuf' and 'nun', the names of two Hebrew letters, equal to 'K' and 'N' which are the first letters of the words "Kost Niks", Dutch for "costs nothing".

External links 
   Koefnoen on the AVRO's official website

Dutch comedy television series
2004 Dutch television series debuts
Dutch satirical television shows
Dutch television sketch shows
Dutch political satire
NPO 1 original programming